The 2023 A Lyga, for sponsorship reasons also called Optibet A lyga is the 34th season of the A Lyga, the top-tier football league of Lithuania. The season is scheduled to begin on 3 March and will conclude in November 2023.

Teams
FK Žalgiris started the season as defending champions. FK Jonava was relegated and replaced with DFK Dainava, returning after one year's absence. Ninth placed FC Džiugas remained in A lyga after winning the playoff with I lyga's FK Neptūnas.

Managers

Current Managers

Regular season

League table

Fixtures and results

Rounds 1–18

Rounds 19–36

Top scorers

See also
 Football in Lithuania

References

External links
 

LFF Lyga seasons
2023 in Lithuanian football